Francis Alexander O'Connor  (13 October 189416 April 1972) was a senior Australian public servant. He was Secretary of the Department of Supply and Shipping (1946–1948) and later the Department of Supply (1953–1959).

Life and career
O'Connor was born in Leongatha, Victoria on 13 October 1894.

O'Connor was appointed Secretary of the Department of Supply and Shipping in September 1946. In 1948, when there was a departmental reorganization, his position was reverted to first assistant secretary.

He was appointed Secretary again in April 1953, the Department was by then known as the Department of Supply. O'Connor retired from the Australian Public Service in 1959.

On 16 April 1972, O'Connor died in Fitzroy, Melbourne aged 77.

Awards
In 1953, O'Connor was made an Officer of the Order of the British Empire He was elevated to a Commander of the Order in June 1957, in recognition of his outstanding public service.

References

1894 births
1972 deaths
Australian public servants
Australian Commanders of the Order of the British Empire
Burials at Box Hill Cemetery